A route nationale, or simply nationale, is a class of trunk road in France. They are important roads of national significance which cross broad portions of the French territory, in contrast to departmental or communal roads which serve more limited local areas.

Their use is free, except when crossing certain structures subject to a toll. They are open to all vehicles, except on certain sections having motorway (autoroute) or express road (voie express) status, both of these categories being reserved for motorized vehicles only.

France at one time had some 30,500 km of routes nationales and publicly owned motorways, but this figure has decreased with the transfer of the responsibility for many routes to the départements so that by 2010 the total length of motorways and other national roads was around 21,100 km. By way of comparison, routes départementales in the same year covered a total distance of 378,000 km.

The layout of the main trunk road network reflects France's centralizing tradition: the majority of them radiate from Paris. The most important trunk roads begin on the parvis of Notre Dame de Paris at a point known as point zéro (kilometre zero). In order to cover the country effectively, there are many other roads that do not serve Paris directly.

History
The system dates back to 16 December 1811, when Napoleon designated a number of routes impériales (imperial highways). First-class routes were numbered from 1 to 14; all began at Paris, radiating out in a clockwise manner. Route 1 ran from Paris north to Calais, and is still the general path of route nationale 1. Second-class routes, from 15 to 27, did the same, while third-class routes from 28 to 229 provided less major connections. During the Bourbon Restoration, in 1824, these routes were renamed routes royales (royal highways) and modified. Route 3, Paris to Hamburg via Soissons, Reims and Liège, was renumbered to 31 and 51, and the subsequent routes were shifted down by one. Routes 19 and 20 were completely outside the post-Napoleon France, and so 21 to 27 became 18 to 24. In 1830 the highways were renamed routes nationales.

In the 21st century, the French Government has downgraded many of the former routes nationales, such as the N7 from Paris to the Côte d'Azur, transferring responsibility for them to the départements.

List of routes nationales

Routes nationales 1 to 25

 style="width:99%"
|-
! style="width: 3em" | Number
! style="text-align:left" | Runs through:
|-
|N1||	Paris - Beauvais - Amiens - Abbeville - Boulogne-sur-Mer - Calais - Dunkirk - Belgium (N39)
|-
|N2||	Paris - Soissons - Laon - Maubeuge - Belgium (N6)
|-
|N3||	Paris - Meaux - Château-Thierry - Épernay - Châlons-en-Champagne - Verdun - Metz - Germany (B41)
|-
|N4||	Paris - Vitry-le-François - Saint-Dizier - Toul - Blâmont - Sarrebourg - Strasbourg - Germany (B28)
|-
|N4A||	Vincennes (N34) - Joinville-le-Pont (N186)
|-
|N5||	Dijon - Dole - Switzerland (Geneva) - Thonon-les-Bains - Saint-Gingolph - Switzerland (21)
|-
|N6||	Paris - Melun - Fontainebleau - Sens - Auxerre - Chalon-sur-Saône - Mâcon - Lyon - Chambéry - Modane - Italy (SS25)
|-
|N7||	Paris - Fontainebleau - Montargis - Cosne-Cours-sur-Loire - Nevers - Moulins - Roanne - Lyon - Vienne - Valence - Montélimar - Orange - Avignon - Aix-en-Provence - Fréjus - Saint-Raphaël - Cannes - Antibes - Nice - Menton - Italy (SS1)
|-
|N8||	Aix-en-Provence - Marseille - Aubagne - Toulon
|-
|N9||	Moulins - Clermont-Ferrand - Issoire - Saint-Chély-d'Apcher - Marvejols - Banassac - Millau - Clermont-l'Hérault - Béziers - Narbonne - Perpignan - Spain (N-II)
|-
|N10||	Saint-Cyr-l'École - Rambouillet - Chartres - Tours - Châtellerault - Poitiers - Angoulême - Bordeaux - Biarritz - Spain (N-I)
|-
|N11||	Poitiers (N10) - Niort - La Rochelle
|-
|N12||	Saint-Cyr-l'École - Dreux - Alençon - Fougères - Liffré - Rennes - Saint-Brieuc - Brest
|-
|N13||	Paris - Saint-Germain-en-Laye - Orgeval - Mantes-la-Jolie - Évreux - Lisieux - Caen - Cherbourg
|-
|N14||	Paris - Enghien - Pontoise - Rouen
|-
|N15||	Bonnières-sur-Seine (A13) - Rouen - Yvetot - Le Havre
|-
|N16||	Pierrefitte (N1) - Creil - Clermont
|-
|N17||	Le Bourget (N2) - Senlis - Arras - Lille - Hallum Belgium (N32)
|-
|N18||	Étain - Longuyon - Longwy - Belgium (N830)
|-
|N19||	Paris - Provins - Troyes - Chaumont - Langres - Vesoul - Belfort - Switzerland
|-
|N20||	Paris - Étampes - Orléans - Vierzon - Châteauroux - Limoges - Brive - Cahors - Montauban - Toulouse - Foix - Bourg-Madame - Spain (N-152)
|-
|N21||	Limoges - Périgueux - Bergerac - Agen - Auch - Tarbes - Argelès-Gazost
|-
|N22||	N20 between Foix and Bourg-Madame - Andorra
|-
|N23||	Chartres - Le Mans - Angers - Nantes
|-
|N24||	Rennes - Lorient
|-
|N25||	Amiens - Arras

Routes nationales 26 to 50

 style="width:99%"
|-
! style="width: 3em" | Number
! style="text-align:left" | Runs through:
|-
|N26||	Verneuil-sur-Avre (N12) - Argentan
|-
|N27||	Rouen - Dieppe
|-
|N28||	Rouen - Abbeville - Dunkirk
|-
|N29||	Yvetot - Amiens - Saint-Quentin - La Capelle
|-
|N30||	Bapaume - Cambrai - Valenciennes - Quiévrain
|-
|N31||	Rouen - Beauvais - Compiègne - Soissons - Reims
|-
|N32||	Compiègne - La Fère
|-
|N33||	Saint-Avold - Creutzwald
|-
|N34||	Vincennes - Coulommiers - Esternay
|-
|N35||	Saint-Dizier - Bar-le-Duc - Verdun
|-
|N36||	Meaux - Melun
|-
|N37||	A6 - RN7
|-
|N38||	
|-
|N39||	Arras - Hesdin - Le Touquet-Paris-Plage
|-
|N40||	
|-
|N41||	Béthune - Lille
|-
|N42||	Boulogne-sur-Mer - Saint-Omer - Bailleul
|-
|N43||	Metz - Sedan - La Capelle - Charleville-Mézières - Cambrai - Douai - Lens - Béthune - Saint-Omer - Calais
|-
|N44||	Cambrai - Saint-Quentin - Laon - Reims - Châlons-en-Champagne - Vitry-le-François
|-
|N45||	Douai - Valenciennes
|-
|N46||	
|-
|N47||	Lens - La Bassée
|-
|N48||	
|-
|N49||	Valenciennes - Maubeuge - Jeumont - Belgium (N54)
|-
|N50||	Arras - Douai

Routes nationales 51 to 75

 style="width:99%"
|-
! style="width: 3em" | Number
! style="text-align:left" | Runs through:
|-
|N51||	Épernay - Reims - Charleville-Mézières - Givet
|-
|N52||	Metz - Thionville - Longwy
|-
|N53||	Thionville - Évrange
|-
|N54||	
|-
|N55||	
|-
|N56||	Saint-Avold - Sarralbe
|-
|N57||	Metz - Nancy - Épinal - Vesoul - Besançon - Pontarlier - Ballaigues
|-
|N58||	Sedan - Bouillon
|-
|N59||	Nancy - Saint-Dié-des-Vosges - Sélestat
|-
|N60||	Orléans - Montargis - Sens - Troyes
|-
|N61||	Phalsbourg - Saarbrücken
|-
|N62||	Sarreguemines - Haguenau
|-
|N63||	Strasbourg - Haguenau - A35
|-
|N64||	
|-
|N65||	Auxerre - A6
|-
|N66||	Remiremont - Mulhouse - Basel
|-
|N67||	Saint-Dizier - Chaumont
|-
|N68||	
|-
|N69||	
|-
|N70||	Paray-le-Monial - Montchanin
|-
|N71||	Troyes - Dijon
|-
|N72||	Access to A6 at Mâcon-Nord.
|-
|N73||	Besançon - Dole - Chalon-sur-Saône
|-
|N74||	 Sarreguemines - Château-Salins - Nancy - Toul - Chaumont - Langres - Dijon - Beaune - Corpeau
|-
|N75||	Bourg-en-Bresse - Grenoble - Sisteron

Routes nationales 76 to 100

 style="width:99%"
|-
! style="width: 3em" | Number
! style="text-align:left" | Runs through:
|-
|N76||	Tours - Vierzon - Bourges - Saint-Pierre-le-Moûtier
|-
|N77||	Auxerre - Troyes - Châlons-en-Champagne
|-
|N78||	Chalon-sur-Saône - Louhans - Lons-le-Saunier - Saint-Laurent-en-Grandvaux
|-
|N79||	Montmarault - Mâcon - Bourg-en-Bresse
|-
|N80||	Autun - Le Creusot - Chalon-sur-Saône
|-
|N81||	Nevers - Autun - Pouilly-en-Auxois
|-
|N82||	Roanne - Saint-Étienne - Chanas
|-
|N83||	Lyon - Bourg-en-Bresse - Lons-le-Saunier - Besançon - Belfort - Colmar - Strasbourg
|-
|N84||	Lyon - Nantua - Bellegarde-sur-Valserine
|-
|N85||	Bourgoin-Jallieu - Grenoble - Gap - Digne-les-Bains - Grasse - Cannes
|-
|N86||	Lyon - Nîmes
|-
|N87||	Grenoble
|-
|N88||	Lyon - Saint-Étienne - Le Puy-en-Velay - Mende - Rodez - Albi - Toulouse
|-
|N89||	Lyon - Thiers - Clermont-Ferrand - Tulle - Périgueux - Libourne - Bordeaux
|-
|N90||	Grenoble - Albertville - Bourg-Saint-Maurice - Col du Petit Saint-Bernard
|-
|N91||	Grenoble - Briançon
|-
|N92||	Romans-sur-Isère - Moirans
|-
|N93||	Viviers - Pierrelatte
|-
|N94||	Gap - Montgenèvre
|-
|N95||	Tain-l'Hermitage - A7 (exit 13)
|-
|N96||	Aubagne - Aix-en-Provence - Manosque - Château-Arnoux-Saint-Auban
|-
|N97||	Toulon - Le Luc
|-
|N98||	Toulon - Fréjus - Saint-Raphaël - Cannes - Nice - Menton
|-
|N99||	
|-
|N100||	Remoulins - Avignon - Apt - Forcalquier

Routes nationales 101 to 125

 style="width:99%"
|-
! style="width: 3em" | Number
! style="text-align:left" | Runs through:
|-
|N101||	Eastern bypass of Remoulins - Link N86-N100
|-
|N102||	Vergongheon - Brioude - Le Puy-en-Velay and Pradelles - Aubenas - Montélimar
|-
|N103||	Conflans-en-Jarnisy - Briey
|-
|N104||	Lognes - Évry - Les Ulis (Francilienne)
|-
|N105||	Melun - Montereau-Fault-Yonne
|-
|N106||	Nîmes - Alès - Florac - Mende - Saint-Chély-d'Apcher
|-
|N107||	Vedène - Le Pontet - Montfavet
|-
|N108||	Marvejols - Barjac
|-
|N109||	Clermont-l'Hérault - Montpellier
|-
|N110||	Montpellier - Alès
|-
|N111|| Biriatou - A63
|-
|N112||	Montpellier - Béziers - Castres - Albi
|-
|N113||	Bordeaux - Agen - Toulouse - Carcassonne - Narbonne - Pézenas - Montpellier - Nîmes - Arles - Salon-de-Provence - Marseille
|-
|N114||	Perpignan - Cerbère
|-
|N115||	Le Boulou - Col d'Ares
|-
|N116||	Perpignan - Bourg-Madame
|-
|N117||	Toulouse - Tarbes - Pau - Bayonne
|-
|N118||	Sèvres - Les Ulis
|-
|N119||	
|-
|N120||	Uzerche - Tulle - Aurillac - Espalion - Rodez
|-
|N121||	Saint-Flour - Espalion
|-
|N122||	Clermont-Ferrand ou Massiac - Aurillac - Villefranche-de-Rouergue - Toulouse
|-
|N123||	Chartres
|-
|N124||	Toulouse - Auch - Mont-de-Marsan - Dax - Saint-Geours-de-Maremne
|-
|N125||	Montréjeau - Fos

Routes nationales 126 to 150

 style="width:99%"
|-
! style="width: 3em" | Number
! style="text-align:left" | Runs through:
|-
|N126||	Toulouse - Castres
|-
|N127||	
|-
|N128||	
|-
|N129||	
|-
|N130||	
|-
|N131||	
|-
|N132||	Cherbourg
|-
|N133||	
|-
|N134||	Saugnacq-et-Muret - Mont-de-Marsan - Pau - col du Somport
|-
|N135||	Bar-le-Duc - Ligny-en-Barrois
|-
|N136||	Rennes
|-
|N137|| Saint-Malo - Rennes - Nantes - La Rochelle - Saintes - Bordeaux
|-
|N138||	Rouen - Alençon - Le Mans - Tours
|-
|N139||	
|-
|N140||	Cressensac - Figeac - Rodez
|-
|N141||	Saintes - Angoulême - Limoges - Aubusson - Clermont-Ferrand
|-
|N142||	Bourges
|-
|N143||	Tours - Châteauroux
|-
|N144||	Bourges - Montluçon - Riom
|-
|N145||	Bellac - Guéret - Montluçon
|-
|N146||	Avallon - A6
|-
|N147||	Angers - Poitiers - Limoges
|-
|N148||	Sainte-Hermine - Niort
|-
|N149||	Nantes - Poitiers
|-
|N150|| Niort - Royan

Routes nationales 151 to 175

 style="width:99%"
|-
! style="width: 3em" | Number
! style="text-align:left" | Runs through:
|-
|N151||	Poitiers - Châteauroux - Bourges - La Charité-sur-Loire - Auxerre
|-
|N152||	Fontainebleau - Orléans - Tours - Angers
|-
|N153||	Thionville - Apach
|-
|N154||	Louviers - Évreux - Dreux - Chartres - Artenay
|-
|N155||	
|-
|N156||	
|-
|N157||	Orléans - Le Mans - Laval - Rennes
|-
|N158||	Caen - Falaise - Sées
|-
|N159||	
|-
|N160||	Angers - Cholet - La Roche-sur-Yon - Les Sables-d'Olonne
|-
|N161||	
|-
|N162||	Mayenne - Laval - Angers
|-
|N163||	
|-
|N164||	Montauban-de-Bretagne - Châteaulin
|-
|N165|| Nantes - Vannes - Lorient - Quimper - Brest
|-
|N166||	Ploërmel - Vannes
|-
|N167||	
|-
|N168||	
|-
|N169||	Lorient - Roscoff
|-
|N170||	
|-
|N171||	La Baule - Châteaubriant - Laval
|-
|N172||	
|-
|N173||	
|-
|N174||	Carentan - Saint-Lô - Vire
|-
|N175||	Rennes - Pontorson - Avranches - Caen - Rouen

Routes nationales 176 to 200

 style="width:99%"
|-
! style="width: 3em" | Number
! style="text-align:left" | Runs through:
|-
|N176||	Pré-en-Pail - Domfront - Dinan - Échangeur N12/E50
|-
|N177||	Pont-l'Évêque - Trouville-sur-Mer
|-
|N178||	
|-
|N179||	
|-
|N180||	
|-
|N181||	
|-
|N182||	
|-
|N183||	
|-
|N184||	Saint-Germain-en-Laye - l'Isle Adam
|-
|N185||	
|-
|N186||	
|-
|N187||	
|-
|N188|| Massy / A10 - Les Ulis
|-
|N189||	
|-
|N190||	
|-
|N191||	Mennecy - Étampes - Ablis
|-
|N192||	
|-
|N193||	
Bastia - Corte, Haute-Corse - Ajaccio
|-
|N194||	
|-
|N195||	
|-
|N196||	
Ajaccio - Bonifacio
|-
|N197||	
Ponte Leccia - Calvi
|-
|N198||	
Casamozza - Bonifacio
|-
|N199||	
|-
|N200||

Routes nationales 201 and beyond

 style="width:99%"
|-
! style="width: 3em" | Number
! style="text-align:left" | Runs through:
|-
|N201|| Perly-Certoux - Saint-Julien-en-Genevois - Annecy - Aix-les-Bains - Chambéry A-41S
|-
|N202||	Nice - Puget-Théniers - Barrême
|-
|N204|| Tende - Breil-sur-Roya
|-
|N205|| Annemasse - Chamonix - Mont Blanc Tunnel
|-
|N206|| Bellegarde-sur-Valserine - Saint-Julien-en-Genevois - Annemasse - Douvaine
|-
|N209|| Varennes-sur-Allier - Vichy - Gannat
|-
|N212|| Sallanches - Megève - Ugine - Albertville
|-
|N215|| Bordeaux - pointe de Grave
|-
|N220|| 
|-
|N248|| Épannes - A10 Echangeur n°33
|-
|N249|| Nantes - Cholet - Bressuire
|-
|N250|| Bordeaux - Arcachon
|-
|N254|| Allaines-Mervilliers - A10 Echangeur n°12
|-
|N274|| Boulevard périphérique de Dijon
|-
|N304|| Aubenas - Loriol-sur-Drôme
|-
|N312|| Agde - A9 Echangeur n°34
|-
|N313|| Aimargues - A9 Echangeur n°26
|-
|N320|| L'Hospitalet-près-l'Andorre - Col de Puymorens - Porté-Puymorens
|-
|N330|| Creil - Senlis - Meaux
|-
|N346|| Rocade Est de Lyon
|-
|N383|| Boulevard périphérique de Lyon
|-
|N420|| Molsheim - Saint-Dié-des-Vosges
|-
|N520|| Contournement de Limoges (16 km)
|-
|N544|| Fos-sur-Mer - La Fossette
|-
|N545|| Fos-sur-Mer - Raffinerie Esso
|-
|N546|| Fos-sur-Mer - D.P.F.
|-
|N568|| Raphèle-lès-Arles - Martigues - Marseille
|-
|N569|| Orgon - Miramas - Istres - Fos-sur-Mer
|-
|N570|| Avignon - Tarascon - Arles
|-
|N2013|| Cherbourg
|-
|N572|| Lunel - Aimargues - Vauvert - Saint-Gilles - Arles - Salon-de-Provence
|-
|N618|| Saint-Jean-de-Luz - Col d'Aubisque - Col d'Aspin - Bagnères-de-Luchon - Saint-Girons - Argelès-sur-Mer
|-
|N814|| Boulevard périphérique de Caen

See also
 Routes Départementales, the category below Routes Nationale in France

References

External links
Routes Nationales

Routes Nationales

fr:Liste des routes nationales de France